Sinnuris (from ) is a city in the Faiyum Governorate, Egypt. Its population was estimated at about 134,000 people in 2021.

References 

Populated places in Faiyum Governorate
Cities in Egypt